The Keele Campus is the main campus of York University in the North York district of Toronto, Ontario, Canada. It occupies roughly 1 square kilometre of land and is situated between Jane Street to the west, Keele Street to the east, Steeles Avenue West to the north and Finch Avenue West to the south. It is the largest post-secondary campus in Canada at 457 acres.

History
The campus was once occupied by farms held by pioneers of the area including:

 James Stong (Lots 22 and 25)
 Daniel Stong (Lot 25)
 Peter Erlin Kaiser (1750-1820) (Lot 24)
 Abraham Hoover (1821-1905) (Lot 23)
 John Boynton (Lot 21)

The area was named Kaiserville after the settler Peter Kaiser, who was buried in the area, while the Stongs left the area in 1951, the Hoovers' till the 1930s.

The original 1960s buildings—now designated Toronto Heritage Properties—were designed and built by joint venture UPACE (with John B. Parkin Associates, Shore and Moffat and Partners, Gordon S. Adamson and Associates) and landscape under Hideo Sasaki.

Central Campus 

The main facilities of the central part of the campus are connected by heated walkways for the safety and convenience of students and staff.

Vari Hall 

Vari Hall, primarily given over to lecture halls, was designed by Raymond Moriyama and constructed in the early 1990s to put a "new face" on the campus. The facility is named for George and Helen Vari, Hungarian refugees and businesspersons who helped finance the building. The three-story rotunda has become a popular place for social gatherings as well as a common protest site.

Ross Humanities and Social Sciences Building 
Most of Ross consists of faculty offices, particularly of those affiliated with Arts. It was named for Dr. Murray G. Ross (1910-2000), the university's founding president (1959 to 1970). There are several small classrooms in the lower floors of the building, as well as a small cinema. Ross also houses the Graduate Pub, one of the few places on campus licensed to sell liquor.

A ramp leading up to the Ross Building was demolished during the building of Vari Hall by 1989.

Ross is divided into two towers: Ross North, and Ross South. Room numbers must be identified with a tower prefix, as the same numbers are used. (i.e. R N403 and R S403)

Central Square/Curtis Lecture Halls 
Central Square is the hub connecting Ross, the Scott Library and the Curtis Lecture Halls. It includes a large cafeteria (with a courtyard), a "bear pit", a small "open" computer lab, several TD ATMs, Booster Juice and several offices focused on student and faculty services.

Scott Library 

The main Scott Library is five stories tall and features thousands of books, periodicals, and other resources. There are designated quiet study areas as well as several small conference rooms which students can reserve to work on group projects.

The building is an example of the Brutalist architecture built at the campus in the 1960s and 1970s and based on a Ziggurat .

The library is named for William Pearson Scott, the member (1959-1971) Chair of the York University Board of Governors (1966-1971).

Steacie Science and Engineering Library

Named for Canadian chemist Edgar William Richard Steacie (1900-1962) and one three key libraries in Keele campus.

Sound and Moving Image Library 
The Sound and Moving Images Library is located on the first floor of Scott Library and houses York's collection of audiovisual materials as well as materials strictly related to music and films. SMIL's collection includes 15,000 documentaries and 4,000 feature films on either DVD, VHS, and film reels. The continuous growing number of documentaries and feature films establishes SMIL as one of the top University Media Libraries in Ontario. The music collection at SMIL has also developed a strong variety with a total of 26,000 CDs and 13,000 Vinyl LPs. A notable strength is in Jazz, accounting for 7,000 items. Roughly a total of a hundred DVD players, Blu-ray players, VCRs, and turntables are available for student use including access to quality headphones. The Sound and Moving Images Library is open Monday-Thursday from 9am-7pm and Fridays from 9am-5pm.

Petrie Science Building 

Built in 1969 Petrie Science Building is home to the York University Observatory, which features two dome towers that house the observatory's astronomical telescopes. The building is named for Scottish-born Canadian astronomer Robert Methven Petrie (1906-1966).

Accolades 
The Accolade Project comprises two new buildings, Accolade East and Accolade West, which frame the existing Fine Arts complex on the south side of The Common at the heart of York University's Keele campus. The new structures offer a wide range of academic, exhibition and performance facilities for teaching, learning, research, creative work and public presentation.  The Accolade Project offers facilities for Canada's future artists and performers. Complementing the facilities of the Faculty of Fine Arts in the Joan & Martin Goldfarb Centre for Fine Arts, Burton Auditorium, the Centre for Film and Theatre, and the Technology-Enhanced Learning Building, Accolade brings all seven fine arts departments together.

Accolade East
Both the Department of Music and the Department of Dance have a new home with facilities in Accolade East. The Art Gallery of York University has also moved into Accolade East. Located east of the Centre for Film and Theatre, facing the Schulich School of Business, Accolade East features exhibition and performing arts facilities, The Sandra Faire and Ivan Fecan Theatre, and The Recital Hall, including the main box office, as well as classrooms and an open-access computer lab serving the entire university.

Accolade West

Located north of the Joan & Martin Goldfarb Centre for Fine Arts and adjacent to Burton Auditorium, Accolade West is used by students from across the university. A four-storey building dedicated primarily to academic studies, the building houses classrooms, seminar rooms and computer labs ranging in capacity from 40 to 400 seats. It houses the student-run gallery of the Department of Visual Arts as well as two new studios for the Fine Arts Cultural Studies program in the Faculty of Fine Arts.

Student Centre 

The Student Centre, has a main floor consisting largely of fast-food and retail, with upper floors given over to offices for student organisations and student-focused services. As of November 2013, the restaurants in the Student Centre include Wendy's, Jimmy the Greek, Pagoda, Gino's Pizza, Mac's Sushi, Treats, Yogen Früz, Island Foods, and Bluemont Bistro. Notable services include the Lee Wiggins Daycare Centre and the campus chapel.

The Underground 
Located in the basement of the Student Centre, the Underground is York's on-campus nightclub, and is popular for its theme nights.
 The Underground

New Student Centre 
Approved via referendum in October 2013, construction on a new student-centre on the Southern end of campus between the Atkinson and Osgoode Hall buildings began in October 2016. The project was completed in Spring 2018

York Lanes 

York Lanes is a two-storey mall at the Keele campus of York University in Toronto, Ontario.

The lower level has restaurants and retail stores including the York University Bookstore at the east end, as well as the on-campus medical office. Offices for faculty of various departments as well as various student groups are located on the second floor. As of November 2013, the restaurants in York Lanes include Hero Burger, Popeyes, Sakura Japanese Restaurant, Qoola Frozen Yogourt Bar, Thaï Express (halal certified), The Campus Bubble Tea, The Great Canadian Bagel, Second Cup, Z-Teca, La Prep, Indian Flavour, Falafel Hut, Cucinetta Italian Cafe, and Berries & Blooms. Shopsy's, a sports bar grill, opened in late 2013.

The layout of the mall is rectangular (long in the East-West direction). It is divided into three sections (arbitrarily based on the bends of the corridor, and not on any other difference between the sections or their contents). One main corridor runs along its length. Slightly diagonal towards the South-West corner at the start (the West Market), then East-West (The Main Wing), and finally turning south for a short span at the East end (the East Market). There is one branch off to a North exit where the West Market meets the Main Wing (where the corridor bends), and there is also a door to a narrow passageway at the West end (just adjacent to the bookstore and opposite the main East exit) to another back exit to the North.

A multi-level parking structure at the rear replaced the old parking lot.

Curtis Lecture Halls 
The Curtis Lecture Halls are a 3-4 floor complex of lecture halls of varying sizes. Built in 1971, the building is named for Air Vice-Marshal Wilfrid A. Curtis, founding organizing committee and first Chancellor of York (1959–1968).

York / Harry W. Arthurs Commons 

The York Harry W. Arthurs Commons is an open long grassy area surrounded by various buildings like Vari Hall, Student Centre, York Lanes. It is named after former York President Harry Arthurs. Its eastern end is home to the campus' main subway station, York University station.

Southern Campus 
The southern part of the campus includes the buildings for York's non-Arts and non-Fine Arts faculties (Atkinson College, Osgoode Hall and Law Library, Seneca@York, Schulich Business School) as well as  the Bennett Centre, which houses various student services, such as admissions, financial aid, and general inquiry.

Victor Phillip Dahdaleh Building (Formerly TEL)

The Victor Phillip Dahdaleh building, colloquially referred to as the TEL Building (its former name), is located at 88 The Pond Road and was considered to be "cutting edge" during its initial inception. The building features 345,000 sq/ft of floor space, 31 classrooms, 42 computer labs, three library and resource centres, a virtual reality centre, a 4000+ student capacity and cost $84 million to build. It was launched as a joint venture between York University and Seneca College as one of their "SuperBuild" projects. Construction began in November 2001 and was completed shortly after the building opened in September 2003. The building features modern architecture with large open spaces, sharply designed walls and incorporates smart technology throughout the building such as multipurpose Wi-Fi in both the 2.4 and 5.8 GHz bands. The building is named for York alumnus and businessperson Victor P.  Dahdaleh.

Health, Nursing and Environmental Studies

The HNE building, properly known as "Health, Nursing and Environmental Studies" was constructed as joint venture between the two faculties. The westernmost portion of the building hosts the Environmental Academic and Administrative offices while the Northern portion of the building hosts the Health and Nursing faculty. Scattered throughout the building are a number of lecture halls and seminar rooms, many of which are located at the lower levels and sub-basement levels.

Seneca @ York

Seneca College shares space at the Keele campus with the Seneca@York building near Atkinson College.

Schulich School of Business

The Schulich School of Business is one of the top business schools in Canada.  It moved to its new home, the Seymour Schulich Building, in August 2003.  The building is known for its open spaces for studying and networking. It is named after a major benefactor and entrepreneur Seymour Schulich (1940-).

Northern Campus 
The northern part of the campus is heavy on residences (Vanier, Founders, Winters and McLaughlin), but also includes the Steadman Lecture Halls, as well as a hub for several athletic facilities:

Alumni Field
Canlan Ice Sports – York - formerly Beatrice Ice Gardens - ice rink that hosts home games for York Lions varsity hockey games & Toronto Six of the Premier Hockey Federation
Sobeys Stadium - formerly the Rexall Centre & Aviva Centre; tennis stadium that hosts annual National Bank Open tournaments
Tait McKenzie Centre - gym and pool named for Canadian born American sculptor, surgeon R. Tait McKenzie; hosts various York Lions varsity sports teams
Toronto Track and Field Centre - formerly Metro Toronto Track and Field Centre
York Lions Stadium - formerly CIBC Pan Am and Parapan Am Athletics Stadium; hosts home games for various York Lions varsity sports teams, Toronto Arrows of Major League Rugby, Toronto FC II of MLS Next Pro, and York United FC of the Canadian Premier League

Former athletic facilities:

National Tennis Centre (Canada) replaced by the Aviva Centre; bleachers and court surfaces were removed and now an abandoned site.

In addition, the campus' other subway station, Pioneer Village station, is on its northern edge just west of the Track and Field Centre.

Western Campus 

The western part of the campus also has several residences (Bethune, Calumet and Stong) and several academic buildings, as well as the Steacie Science & Engineering library. A notable presence is the William Small building, which used to house a large "computer pool" and currently houses the university's Transportation and Security departments.

Aviva Centre is located on the west side of the campus having moved over from the Toronto Track and Field Centre to the north.

Stong Pond is a storm water pond that was rebuilt to handle stormwater drained from around the entire campus.

Residences 

York is home to several residences:

 Atkinson Residence - 9 floor complex named for Toronto Star publisher Joseph E. Atkinson
 Calumet - four floor apartment complex consisting of 11 houses with four co-ed suites each. Each suite consists of six occupants with four single bedrooms and one double bedroom. The occupants share two bathrooms, a kitchen, and a lounge area.   
 Founder's - four floor low-rise apartment complex
 Harry Sherman Crowe Co-op - 7 floor complex named for Professor Harry Sherman Crowe, educator, administrator and labour researcher at York University (Administrator of Atkinson College) and United College (now University of Winnipeg)
 Norman Bethune - 14 storey tower named for Dr. Norman Bethune
 Passy Gardens - 3 storey towers and named for Claude Passy, who owned the Hoover residence in 1958 and sold to the University in 1964.
 Stong - 14 storey tower named for area settlers and owners of the land where the Keele campus sits Daniel and Jacob Stong
 The Pond Road - 9 floor complex named for the Tennis Canada (York) Pond and Stong Pond (source of Hoover Creek) next to the York Arboretum
 Tatham Hall - 13 storey tower named for Professor George Tatham, founding Master of McLaughlin College
 Vanier - 13 storey tower named for former Governor General of Canada Georges Vanier
 Winters - four floor low-rise apartment complex named for former Liberal MP and cabinet minister Robert Winters

The Village 
Beyond the university's Southern border (The Pond Rd) lies a subdivision referred to as The Village. While not on university property, many students who do not live in the University residences live in the townhouses used as rooming houses. Although it is off university property, York offers a shuttle service between the Village and campus.

Jacob Stong House and Barn

The campus also host a historic home and barn located at the northeast end of the campus.

The barn is believed to have been built around or after 1854 and the house before 1860.

Both were owned by the Stong family until 1951 and later by York University for housing as well as studio facility for the Faculty of Fine Arts. The two buildings have historic designation by the City of Toronto.

References 

York University
Universities and colleges in Toronto
North York
Educational institutions established in 1959
Brutalist architecture in Canada
Modernist architecture in Canada
York University Keele Campus York Commons and Central Square
Articles containing video clips
York University buildings
1959 establishments in Ontario